Club Deportivo Aspirante is a Salvadoran professional football club based in Jucuapa, Usulután, El Salvador.

History
C.D. Aspirante were formed on 18 May 1958 by Rafael Gálvez en la ciudad de Jucuapa. In 2001 they won promotion to the second tier of Salvadoran football. Con el sueño de subir a Primera División Aspirante es de los equipos más representativos de segunda división con más historia con más tiempo en segunda división profesional Their greatest achievement was just missing promotion to the Salvadoran Premier Division after a 2–1 loss to Chalatenango in 2003. Prior to the tournament Aspirante's created a new administration, Mr. Manuel Turcios was named the new President of the Club. One of Mr. Turcio's first steps was to hire a new coach, Professor Mario Martínez. After agreeing to his contract terms Martínez started recruiting players in the district to form the basis of the team that would come so close to achieving promotion. However due to poor results and dealing with the local supporters Martínez handed in his resignation and despite the setback the club would just miss out on promotion. After the success the club has mainly stayed midtable failing to achieving the high they had once reached.

Honours

Domestic honours
 Segunda División Salvadorean and predecessors 
 Runners-up (1) : 2003
 Tercera División Salvadorean and predecessors 
 Champions:(1) : 2001

Current squad
As of:

Personnel

Management

List of coaches

  Miguel Aguilar Obando (2000)
  Mauro Abel Parada (2001)
  Mario Martínez (2002)
  Manuel de la Paz Palacios (2002–03)
  Eraldo Correia (2003)
  Oscar Emigdio Benítez (2003)
  Víctor "El Toba" Girón
  Luis Marines
  Esteban Melara
  Carlos Mario Joya (2011–2012)
  Efraín Núñez (2012)
  Carlos Romero (2012–2013)
  Joaquín Pérez (2013–2014)
 Carlos Mario Joya (2014–2015)
  Carlos Romero (2015)
  Miguel Aguilar Obando (June 2015–Aug 2015)
  Mauro Abel Parada (Aug 2015- July 2016)
  Joaquin Perez (July 2016- June 2017)
  Victor Giron (July 2017 - Sep 2017)	
  Eduardo Santana (Oct 2017-Feb 2018)
  Oscar David Ramirez (July 2018-Sep 2018)
  José Mario Martínez (Sep 2018-July 2019)
  Willian Chevez (July 2019 - December 2019)
  Sebastian Hernandez Sigaran (January 2020 - February 2020)
  Carlos Martinez (February 2020 - June 2020)
  Jorge Calles (July 2020 - January 2021)
  Carlos Che Martinez (January 2021 - June 2021)
  Samael Virgil (August 2021 - Present)

References

External links
 Club website – CD Aspirante 

Aspirante
Aspirante
1958 establishments in El Salvador